42 is a 2013 American biographical sports film about baseball player Jackie Robinson, the first black athlete to play in Major League Baseball (MLB) during the modern era. Written and directed by Brian Helgeland, the film stars Chadwick Boseman as Robinson, alongside Harrison Ford, Nicole Beharie, Christopher Meloni, André Holland, Lucas Black, Hamish Linklater and Ryan Merriman in supporting roles. The title of the film is a reference to Robinson's jersey number, which was universally retired across all MLB teams in 1997.

The project was announced in June 2011, with principal photography taking place in Macon, Georgia and Atlanta Film Studios Paulding County in Hiram as well as in Alabama and Chattanooga, Tennessee.

42 was theatrically released in the United States on April 12, 2013. The film received generally positive reviews from critics, who praised the performances of Boseman and Ford, and it grossed $97.5 million on a production budget of $31–40 million.

Plot

In 1945, Brooklyn Dodgers owner Branch Rickey meets with sportswriter Wendell Smith regarding wanting to recruit a black baseball player for his team; Wendell suggests Jackie Robinson of the Kansas City Monarchs. Robinson accepts, but is warned by Rickey that he must control his temper despite the adversities he will face while breaking the color line. Robinson proposes to his girlfriend, Rachel, and she accepts.

Robinson earns a spot with the Montreal Royals, the AAA affiliate of the Brooklyn farm system. After performing well his first season, he advances to the Dodgers and is trained as a first baseman. Some of the Dodgers draft a petition refusing to play with Robinson, but manager Leo Durocher rebuffs them. However, Durocher is suspended by Baseball Commissioner Happy Chandler due to his extramarital affair. Burt Shotton takes over as manager. Robinson and Rachel have their first child.

In a game against the Philadelphia Phillies, manager Ben Chapman taunts Robinson with racial epithets. With encouragement from Rickey, Robinson scores the winning run. When Chapman's behavior toward Robinson generates negative press for the team, Phillies' general manager Herb Pennock requires him to pose with Robinson for Life magazine.

Later, Pee Wee Reese comes to understand what kind of pressure Robinson is facing, and makes a public show of solidarity, standing with his arm around Robinson's shoulders before a hostile crowd at Crosley Field in Cincinnati, silencing them.

In a game against the St. Louis Cardinals, Enos Slaughter spikes Robinson on the back of the leg with his cleats. The Dodgers want revenge, but Robinson calms them and insists they focus on winning the game.

Robinson's home run against Pittsburgh Pirates pitcher Fritz Ostermueller, who had earlier hit him in the head, helps the Dodgers clinch the National League pennant, sending them to the World Series.

A series of texts is shown in the epilogue of the film regarding Robinson and his teammates’ future involvements, as well as others.

Cast

 Chadwick Boseman as Jackie Robinson
 Harrison Ford as Branch Rickey
 André Holland as Wendell Smith
 Christopher Meloni as Leo Durocher
 John C. McGinley as Red Barber
 Toby Huss as Clyde Sukeforth
 Lucas Black as Pee Wee Reese
 Alan Tudyk as Ben Chapman
 Nicole Beharie as Rachel Isum Robinson
 C. J. Nitkowski as Dutch Leonard
 Brett Cullen as Clay Hopper
 Gino Anthony Pesi as Joe Garagiola Sr.
 Ryan Merriman as Dixie Walker
 T. R. Knight as Harold Parrott
 Hamish Linklater as Ralph Branca
 Brad Beyer as Kirby Higbe
 Jesse Luken as Eddie Stanky
 Max Gail as Burt Shotton
 Peter MacKenzie as Happy Chandler
 Linc Hand as Fritz Ostermueller
 Jeremy Ray Taylor as Boy
 James Pickens Jr. as Mr. Brock
 Dusan Brown as young Ed Charles
 Peter Jurasik as Hotel Manager
 Colman Domingo as Lawson Bowman

Former minor league player Jasha Balcom served as a stuntman for Boseman in some of the film's scenes.

Production

Development
Spike Lee planned to write and direct a film based on the life of Jackie Robinson and had it set up at Turner Pictures under his 40 Acres and a Mule Filmworks in 1995. The studio wanted to release it in 1997 to coincide with the 50th anniversary of Robinson's breaking of the color barrier, and courted Denzel Washington to star, but the project fell apart in 1996 over creative differences. In March 1997, Lee found favor with Columbia Pictures, who signed him to a three-year first-look deal. Columbia President Amy Pascal reflected that it would bring "enormous potential for Spike to reach audiences that are not traditionally associated with Spike Lee movies." The project eventually fell apart, but in 2004 Robert Redford set up a Jackie Robinson biopic as producer with Deep River Productions, as well as his own production company, Wildwood Productions. Redford also intended to co-star as Branch Rickey, and Howard Baldwin joined as producer the following year. In June 2011, it was announced that Legendary Pictures would develop and produce a Jackie Robinson biopic with Brian Helgeland on board to write and direct, under a distribution deal with Warner Bros. Legendary collaborated with Robinson's widow, Rachel Robinson, to ensure the authenticity of her husband's story. She had previously been involved with Redford's project.

Filming
42 was filmed primarily in Macon, Georgia, Birmingham, Alabama, and Chattanooga, Tennessee. Some interior scenes were shot at Atlanta Film Studios Paulding County in Hiram, Georgia.

Most of the interior stadium shots were filmed in Engel Stadium in Chattanooga, Tennessee, while some were shot at historic Rickwood Field in Birmingham, Alabama, which also served as the set for games-action scenes at Forbes Field, Roosevelt Stadium, Shibe Park, as well as itself in the film's opening. Utilizing old photographs and stadium blueprints, Ebbets Field, Shibe Park, The Polo Grounds, Crosley Field, Sportsman’s Park, and Forbes Field were recreated for the film using digital imagery.

Reception

Critical response
On Rotten Tomatoes, 42 holds an approval rating of 81% based on 197 reviews, with an average rating of 6.90/10. The website's critics consensus reads, "42 is an earnest, inspirational, and respectfully told biography of an influential American sports icon, though it might be a little too safe and old-fashioned for some." On Metacritic, the film holds a weighted average score of 62 out of 100, based on 40 critics, indicating "generally favorable reviews". Audiences polled by CinemaScore gave the film a rare "A+" grade.

Richard Roeper stated, "This is a competent but mostly unexceptional film about a most extraordinary man." Lisa Kennedy, of the Denver Post, lauded the film, saying "This story inspires and entertains with a vital chapter in this nation's history." Conversely, Peter Rainer, of The Christian Science Monitor, criticized the film as "TV-movie-of-the-week dull.... Robinson's ordeal is hammered home to the exclusion of virtually everything else in his life."

The film's actors were generally praised, with Owen Gleiberman saying of Ford, "He gives an ingeniously stylized cartoon performance, his eyes atwinkle, his mouth a rubbery grin, his voice all wily Southern music, though with that growl of Fordian anger just beneath it". The Hollywood Reporter commented that Boseman "has the necessary appeal, proves convincing as an athlete and is expressive in spite of the fact that the man he's playing must mostly keep his true feelings bottled up."

Jackie Robinson's widow, Rachel Robinson, was involved in the production of the film and has praised the end result, saying, "It was important to me because I wanted it to be an authentic piece. I wanted to get it right. I didn't want them to make him an angry black man or some stereotype, so it was important for me to be in there. ... I love the movie. I'm pleased with it. It's authentic and it's also very powerful."

In a 2023 interview with James Hibberd of The Hollywood Reporter, Ford cited his role as Branch Rickey as one of his roles he is most proud of.

Box office
42 grossed $95 million in the United States and $2.5 million in other territories, for a worldwide total of $97.5 million, against a production budget of $40 million.

The film earned $27.3 million for its opening weekend, the best-ever debut for a baseball-themed film. It then made $17.7 million and $10.7 million on its second and third weekends, finishing second and third, respectively.

Following Chadwick Boseman's death in August 2020, several theater chains, including AMC and Regal, announced they would be re-releasing the film in September.

Home media
42 was released on DVD and Blu-ray on July 16, 2013 in the United States and on February 3, 2014 in the U.K.

Historical inaccuracies
Robinson and Rachel Isum became engaged in 1943, while he was still in the United States Army and before he began his professional baseball career, unlike in the film, where he proposes after signing the contract with the Dodgers.

The Dodgers 1947 spring training was in Havana, Cuba, not in Panama, as shown in the film.

The suspension of Leo Durocher was not directly as a result of his affair with Laraine Day, but largely because of his association with "known gamblers."

The scene of Robinson breaking his bat in the dugout tunnel is not based in fact. Both Rachel Robinson and Ralph Branca, film consultant and Dodger pitcher in the dugout that day, say it did not happen. Director Helgeland concurs, explaining that his justification for including the scene was that he felt "there was no way Robinson could have withstood all that abuse without cracking at least once, even if it was in private."

Red Barber would not have broadcast Dodger away games from the opposing team's ballpark in Philadelphia and Cincinnati, as shown in the film. Radio broadcasts of away games in this era were recreated back at the studio from a pitch-by-pitch summary transmitted over telegraph wire from the stadium where the game was being played.

In the film, Wendell Smith is said to have been the first black member of the Baseball Writers' Association of America (BBWAA). In reality, Sam Lacy was the first, having joined in 1948.

Pirates pitcher Fritz Ostermueller threw left-handed, not right-handed as in the film. His first-inning pitch hit Robinson on the left wrist, not his head, and he claimed it was a routine brushback pitch without racist intent. There was no fight on the mound afterwards. The climactic scene in which Robinson hit a home run to clinch the National League pennant for the Dodgers came in the top of the fourth inning of the game and did not secure the victory or the pennant (it made the score 1–0, and the Dodgers eventually won 4–2). The Dodgers achieved a tie for the pennant on that day, before winning the pennant the next day.

See also
 List of black films of the 2010s
 List of sports films
 List of baseball films
 Ebbets Field Flannels

References

External links

 
 
 
 42 at Beyond Chron

Cultural depictions of Jackie Robinson
2013 films
2013 biographical drama films
2010s sports drama films
African-American biographical dramas
American baseball films
American sports drama films
African-American films
Biographical films about sportspeople
Brooklyn Dodgers
2010s English-language films
Films about racism in the United States
Films directed by Brian Helgeland
Films produced by Thomas Tull
Films scored by Mark Isham
Films set in 1945
Films set in 1946
Films set in 1947
Films set in New York City
Films set in Manhattan
Films set in Brooklyn
Films set in California
Films set in Florida
Films set in Philadelphia
Films set in Pittsburgh
Films set in Cincinnati
Films set in St. Louis
Films set in Panama
Films shot in Alabama
Films shot in Georgia (U.S. state)
Films shot in Tennessee
Legendary Pictures films
Films with screenplays by Brian Helgeland
Warner Bros. films
2013 drama films
2010s American films
Films about Major League Baseball